This article presents a list of the historical events and publications of Australian literature during 2016.

Major publications

Literary fiction
 Melissa Ashley – The Birdman's Wife
 Georgia Blain – Between a Wolf and a Dog
Hannah Kent – The Good People
 Heather Rose – The Museum of Modern Love
Josephine Wilson – Extinctions

Children's and young adult fiction
 Trace Balla – Rockhopping
 Maxine Beneba Clarke – The Patchwork Bike
 Andy Griffiths – The Tree House Fun Book and The 78-Storey Treehouse
 Zana Fraillon – The Bone Sparrow
Shivaun Plozza – Frankie
 Richard Roxburgh – Artie and the Grime Wave
 Shaun Tan – Tales from Outer Suburbia
Claire Zorn – One Would Think the Deep

Crime
 Jane Harper – The Dry
 David Whish-Wilson – Old Scores

Science fiction and fantasy
 Juliet Marillier – Den of Wolves
 Lian Hearn – Emperor of the Eight Islands

Poetry
 John Kinsella (poet) – Drowning in Wheat
 Susan Varga – Rupture: Poems 2012–2015

Biographies
 Deng Thiak Adut with Ben McKelvey – Songs of a War Boy: My Story
 Julia Baird – Victoria: The Queen
 Jimmy Barnes –Working Class Boy
 Mark Colvin – Light and Shadow: Memoirs of a Spy's Son
 Suzanne Falkiner – Mick: A Life of Randolph Stow
 Stan Grant – Talking to My Country
 Cory Taylor – Dying: A Memoir

Non-fiction
 Richard Fidler – Ghost Empire
 Peter FitzSimons – Victory at Villers-Bretonneux: Why a French town will never forget the Anzacs
 Clementine Ford – Fight Like A Girl
 Helen Garner – Everywhere I Look
 David Hunt – True Girt: The Unauthorised History of Australia volume 2
 Lynne Kelly – The Memory Code
 Tara Moss – Speaking Out: A 21st Century Handbook For Women and Girls

Awards and honours

Note: these awards were presented in the year in question.

Lifetime achievement

Fiction

National

Children and young adult

National

Crime and mystery

International

National

Science fiction

Non-fiction

Poetry

Drama

Deaths

 31 January – David Lake, science fiction novelist (born 1929 in India)
4 February – Dimitris Tsaloumas, poet (born 1921 in Greece)
19 February – Kim Gamble, illustrator of children's books (born 1952)
 3 April – Bob Ellis, writer, journalist, filmmaker, and political commentator (born 10 May 1942)
 20 April – Dame Leonie Judith Kramer, author, editor and academic  (born 1 October 1924)
 16 May – Gillian Mears, short story writer and novelist (born 21 July 1964)
 5 July – Cory Taylor, writer (born 1955)
 15 July – Billy Marshall Stoneking, poet, playwright, filmmaker, and teacher (born 31 August 1947)
 4 September – Richard Neville, writer and social commentator (born 16 December 1941)
 8 September – Inga Clendinnen, author and historian (born 17 August 1934)
 5 October – Narelle Oliver, ward-winning children's author-illustrator, artist and print maker (born 25 February 1960)
 9 December – Georgia Blain, novelist, journalist and biographer (born 12 December 1964)
12 December –
Anne Deveson, writer, broadcaster, filmmaker and social commentator (born 19 June 1930)
Shirley Hazzard, novelist, short story writer, and essayist (born 30 January 1931)

See also
 Literature
 List of years in Australian literature
 List of Australian literary awards

References

Note: all references relating to awards can, or should be, found on the relevant award's page.

Literature
Australian literature by year
Years of the 21st century in Australia 
Years of the 21st century in literature